Tarum is a moshav in central Israel. Located to the north of Beit Shemesh with an area of 1,800 dunams, it falls under the jurisdiction of Mateh Yehuda Regional Council. Tarum is built near the ancient biblical town of Zorah.

History
Tarum was established in 1950 on land which had belonged to the depopulated Palestinian village of Sar'a. 

The founders of Tarum were immigrants from Yemen, who  were later joined by Cochin Jews  from India. Its name is taken from Psalms 89:14, as is the name of the neighbouring moshav Ta'oz;
Thine is an arm with might; strong is Thy hand, and exalted is Thy right hand.

Gallery

References

Moshavim
Populated places established in 1950
Populated places in Jerusalem District
Yemeni-Jewish culture in Israel
1950 establishments in Israel